John Upfold Pettit (September 11, 1820 – March 21, 1881) was an American lawyer and politician who served three terms as a U.S. Representative from Indiana from 1855 to 1861.

Biography 
Born in Fabius, New York, Pettit attended Hamilton College in Clinton, New York, and was graduated from Union College, Schenectady, New York, in 1839.
He studied law, was admitted to the bar in 1841 and commenced practice in Wabash, Indiana.
Pettit served as American consul to Maranham, Brazil, from 1850 to 1853.

Congress 
Pettit was elected as an Indiana People's Party candidate to the Thirty-fourth Congress and reelected as a Republican to the Thirty-fifth, and Thirty-sixth Congresses (March 4, 1855 – March 3, 1861).
He served as chairman of the Committee on Expenditures in the Post Office Department (Thirty-fourth Congress).

Later career and death 
He served as a member of the state house of representatives in 1865 and was elected speaker. Later, Pettit served as judge of the twenty-seventh judicial district of Indiana (1872–1880).

He died in Wabash, Indiana, March 21, 1881, and was interred in Falls Cemetery.

References

External links
 

1820 births
1881 deaths
People from Fabius, New York
Opposition Party members of the United States House of Representatives from Indiana
Speakers of the Indiana House of Representatives
Republican Party members of the Indiana House of Representatives
American consuls
19th-century American diplomats
Indiana lawyers
Union College (New York) alumni
19th-century American politicians
19th-century American lawyers
American expatriates in Brazil
Republican Party members of the United States House of Representatives from Indiana